The Misfit Economy: Lessons in Creativity From Pirates, Hackers, Gangsters, And Other Informal Entrepreneurs is a 2015 book by Alexa Clay and Kyra Maya Phillips about the innovators and entrepreneurs amongst the underground economies and grey markets of the world.

Reception
It has been reviewed by The Financial Times, The National, New York Daily News, Dallas News, the Stanford Social Innovation Review, and Business Insider. The authors were interviewed about the book in Forbes.

References

Business books
Entrepreneurship
Non-fiction crime books
Underground culture
Informal economy
2015 non-fiction books
Simon & Schuster books